Henry John "Heinie" Miller (January 1, 1893 – June 9, 1964) was an American football player and coach from 1920 to 1942.  He played in The National Football League (NFL) for the Buffalo All-Americans and the Milwaukee Badgers.  Miller also played for the Union Club of Phoenixville, and its later incarnation, the Union Athletic Association of Philadelphia.  He was also a player-coach for the Frankford Yellow Jackets, prior to their NFL membership in 1926.  Before playing professional football, Miller played college football for the University of Pennsylvania.  While playing for the Penn Quakers football team, he was a consensus first-team All-American in both 1917 and 1919.

Miller died at the age of 71 at his home in Longport, New Jersey.

Head coaching record

College

References

1893 births
1964 deaths
American football ends
American football guards
Buffalo All-Americans players
Milwaukee Badgers players
Frankford Yellow Jackets players
Frankford Yellow Jackets coaches
Penn Quakers football players
Saint Joseph's Hawks football coaches
Temple Owls football coaches
Union Club of Phoenixville players
Union Quakers of Philadelphia players
West Chester Golden Rams football coaches
High school football coaches in Pennsylvania
People from Longport, New Jersey
Coaches of American football from Pennsylvania
Players of American football from Pennsylvania